Cato Maximilian Guldberg (11 August 1836 – 14 January 1902) was a Norwegian mathematician and chemist.   Guldberg is best known as a pioneer in physical chemistry.

Background
Guldberg was born in Christiania (now Oslo), Norway. He was the eldest son of Carl August Guldberg (1812–92) and Hanna Sophie Theresia Bull (1810–54). He was the brother of nurse and educator Cathinka Guldberg as well as mathematician Axel Sophus Guldberg.
He attended Aug. Holths private latinskole in Christiania. Guldberg studied mathematics and physics at the University of Christiania and took his diploma in 1859. That same year he received the Crown Prince's gold medal (Kronprinsens gullmedalje) for a dissertation in pure mathematics. He received a travel and education scholarship in 1861, studying applied mathematics and machine learning in (Germany), Switzerland and France.

Career
Guldberg first taught at Hartvig Nissens skole in Christiania. Gulberg worked at the Royal Frederick University becoming a college fellow in 1867 and received a professorship in applied mathematics in 1869.
Together with his brother-in-law, Peter Waage, he proposed the law of mass action. This law attracted little attention until, in 1877, Jacobus Henricus van 't Hoff arrived at a similar relationship and experimentally demonstrated its validity.

In 1890, he published what is now known as the Guldberg rule, which states that the normal boiling point of a liquid is two-thirds of the critical temperature when measured on the absolute scale.
 
From 1866 to 1868, 1869 to 1872 and 1874 to 1875 he was the chairman of the Norwegian Polytechnic Society.

Honours 
   Sweden-Norway:
 Knight of the Order of Vasa, 1866
 Knight of the Polar Star, 1882
 Knight of St. Olav, 1891; Commander 2nd Class, 21 January 1896
 Knight of the Order of Charles XIII, 28 January 1899
 : Knight of the Dannebrog, 30 August 1872

References

Publications 
 
 - English translation of Waage and Guldberg's 1864 paper (above)

Related reading
Peter Østrøm.  Guldberg and Waage on the Influence of Temperature on the Rates of Chemical Reactions (Centaurus. Volume 28, Issue 3. Pages 277–287. October 1985)
Robin E. Ferner and Jeffrey K. Aronson. Cato Guldberg and Peter Waage, the history of the Law of Mass Action, and its relevance to clinical pharmacology (Br J Clin Pharmacol. 2016 Jan; 81(1): 52–55)

External links

1836 births
1902 deaths
Scientists from Oslo
University of Oslo alumni
Academic staff of the University of Oslo
Norwegian chemists
19th-century Norwegian mathematicians
Royal Norwegian Society of Sciences and Letters
Recipients of the St. Olav's Medal
Knights of the Order of the Dannebrog
Recipients of the Order of Vasa
Order of the Polar Star
Knights of the Order of Charles XIII